The Feather & Father Gang is a 1976–1977 American crime-drama television series starring Stefanie Powers and Harold Gould, which centers on an attorney who enlists her con-man father and his team of bunco artists to help her solve crimes. The show aired from December 6, 1976, to July 30, 1977.

Cast
Stefanie Powers....Toni "Feather" Danton
Harold Gould....Harry Danton
Frank Delfino...Enzo
Joan Shawlee....Margo
Monte Landis....Michael
Lewis Charles....Lou

Synopsis

Toni "Feather" Danton is a beautiful and clever young attorney. Her father, Harry Danton, is a shrewd and skillful confidence man. To keep Harry out of trouble, Feather hires him as an investigator for her law firm. Feather and Harry work together to help their friends and Feather's clients by bringing criminals to justice. Feather uses legal means, while Harry uses his underworld connections and extensive knowledge of scams and stings to help her with her cases. Harry assembles a gang of bunco artists—the "Feather and Father Gang"—who use disguises and elaborate ruses to trick the murderers and swindlers who victimize Feather's friends and clients into incriminating themselves.

Production
Created by William Driskill, The Feather and Father Gang was perceived as an imitation for ABC of CBSs successful crime drama Switch, which aired from 1975 to 1978. Coincidentally, Powers later costarred with one of the stars of Switch, Robert Wagner, in another crime drama, Hart to Hart, which ran for five seasons beginning in 1979.

Larry White was the executive producer of The Feather and Father Gang. Driskill wrote the pilot episode, "Never Con a Killer", a 90-minute made-for-television movie that was broadcast as the series sixth episode. Other writers who wrote episodes included George Kirgo, Harold Livingston, and Mann Rubin.

Episode directors included Bruce Bilson, Jackie Cooper, Buzz Kulik, Jerry London, Ernest Pintoff, Seymour Robbie, and Barry Shear.

Broadcast history

The Feather and Father Gangs first episode aired on December 6, 1976. After a three-month hiatus, it returned to the ABC lineup on March 7, 1977, as a weekly series beginning with its second episode, airing at 10:00 pm on Mondays until April 4, 1977. It then went into hiatus again, returning to the air on Friday, May 13, 1977, when ABC broadcast its pilot, "Never Con a Killer", filmed to run as a 90-minute made-for-television movie, as its sixth episode. On May 21, 1977, the show returned to 60-minute episodes and settled into a new time slot at 10:00 pm on Saturdays.

Criticized as a derivative and pale imitation of Switch and handicapped by its lack of a consistent broadcast day and time, The Feather and Father Gang garnered disappointing ratings and was cancelled after 14 episodes. Its last original episode aired on July 30, 1977, and the last rerun in prime time was on August 6, 1977.

Episodes
Sources

References

External links
 
 The Feather and Father Gang opening credits on YouTube
 Clip from The Feather and Father Gang episode "The People's Choice" on YouTube
 The Feather and Father Gang pilot episode "Never Con a Killer" on YouTube
 Promotional Photos from The Feather and Father Gang on YouTube

American Broadcasting Company original programming
1976 American television series debuts
1977 American television series endings
1970s American crime drama television series
English-language television shows
Television series by Sony Pictures Television
Television shows set in Philadelphia